Dustabad (also Romanized as Dūstābād; also known as Dastābād) is a village in Seh Qaleh Rural District, Seh Qaleh District, Sarayan County, South Khorasan Province, Iran. At the 2006 census, its population was 1,627, in 356 families.

References 

Populated places in Sarayan County